Ball State University (Ball State, State or BSU) is a public research university in Muncie, Indiana. It has two satellite facilities in Fishers and Indianapolis. 

On July 25, 1917, the Ball brothers, industrialists and founders of the Ball Corporation, acquired the foreclosed Indiana Normal Institute for $35,100 and gave the school and surrounding land to the State of Indiana. The Indiana General Assembly accepted the donation in the spring of 1918, with an initial 235 students enrolling at the Indiana State Normal School – Eastern Division on June 17, 1918.

Ball State is classified among "R2: Doctoral Universities – High research activity". The university is composed of seven academic colleges. , total enrollment was 21,597 students, including 15,205 undergraduates and 5,817 postgraduates. The university offers about 120 undergraduate majors and 130 minor areas of study and more than 100 master's, doctoral, certificate, and specialist degrees.

There are more than 400 student organizations and clubs on campus, including 31 fraternities and sororities. Ball State athletic teams compete in Division I of the NCAA and are known as the Ball State Cardinals. The university is a member of the Mid-American Conference and the Midwestern Intercollegiate Volleyball Association. In Fall 2020, the university formed a varsity esports team and joined the Esports Collegiate Conference.

History

Predecessor schools 
The location of today's Ball State University had its start in 1899 as a private university called the Eastern Indiana Normal School. The entire school, including classrooms, a library, and the president's residence were housed in what is today's Frank A. Bracken Administration Building. The one-building school had a peak enrollment of 256 and charged $10 for a year's tuition. It operated until the spring of 1901, when it was closed by its president, F.A.Z. Kumler, due to lack of funding. A year later, in the autumn of 1902, the school reopened as Palmer University for the next three years when Francis Palmer, a retired Indiana banker, gave the school a $100,000 endowment.

Between 1905 and 1907, the school dropped the Palmer name and operated as the Indiana Normal College. It had two divisions, the Normal School for educating teachers and the College of Applied Sciences. The school had an average enrollment of about 200 students. Due to diminishing enrollment and lack of funding, school president Francis Ingler closed Indiana Normal College at the end of the 1906–1907 school year. Between 1907 and 1912, the campus sat unused. In 1912, a group of local investors led by Michael Kelly reopened the school as the Indiana Normal Institute. To pay for updated materials and refurbishing the once-abandoned Administration Building, the school operated under a mortgage from the Muncie Trust Company. Although the school had its largest student body with a peak enrollment of 806, officials could not maintain mortgage payments, and the school was forced to close once again in June 1917 when the Muncie Trust Company initiated foreclosure proceedings.

The Ball brothers and Ball State Teachers College era (1917–1960) 

On July 25, 1917, the Ball brothers, local industrialists and founders of the Ball Corporation, bought the Indiana Normal Institute from foreclosure. The Ball brothers also founded Ball Memorial Hospital and Minnetrista, and were the benefactors of Keuka College, founded by their uncle, George Harvey Ball. For $35,100, the Ball brothers bought the Administration Building and surrounding land. In early 1918, during the Indiana General Assembly's short session, state legislators accepted the gift of the school and land by the Ball brothers. The state granted operating control of the Muncie campus and school buildings to the administrators of the Indiana State Normal School in Terre Haute. That same year, the Marion Normal Institute relocated to Muncie, adding its resources to what would officially be named the Indiana State Normal School – Eastern Division. An initial 235 students enrolled on June 17, 1918, with William W. Parsons assuming the role as the first president of the university.

The close relationship between the Balls and the school led to an unofficial moniker for the college, with many students, faculty, and local politicians casually referring to the school as "Ball State," a shorthand alternative to its longer, official name. During the 1922 short session of the Indiana legislature, the state renamed the school as Ball Teachers College. This was in recognition of the Ball family's continuing beneficence to the institution. During this act, the state also reorganized its relationship with Terre Haute and established a separate local board of trustees for the Muncie campus. In 1924, Ball Teachers College's trustees hired Benjamin J. Burris as the successor to President Linnaeus N. Hines. The Ball brothers continued giving to the university and partially funded the construction of the Science Hall (now called Burkhardt Building) in 1924 and an addition to Ball Gymnasium in 1925. By the 1925–1926 school year, Ball State enrollment reached 991 students: 697 women and 294 men. Based on the school's close relationship with the Ball Corporation, a long-running nickname for the school was "Fruit Jar Tech."
During the regular legislative session of 1929, the General Assembly nominally separated the Terre Haute and Muncie campuses of the state teachers college system, but it placed the governing of the Ball State campus under the Indiana State Teachers College Board of Trustees based in Terre Haute. With this action, the school was renamed Ball State Teachers College. The following year, enrollment increased to 1,118, with 747 female and 371 male students.
In 1935, the school added the Fine Arts Building for art, music, and dance instruction. Enrollment that year reached 1,151: 723 women and 428 men. As an expression of the many gifts from the Ball family since 1917, sculptor Daniel Chester French was commissioned by Muncie's chamber of commerce to cast a bronze fountain figure to commemorate the 20th anniversary of the Ball brothers' gift to the state. His creation, the statue Beneficence, still stands today between the Administration Building and Lucina Hall where Talley Avenue ends at University Avenue.

Ball State, like the rest of the nation, was affected by the onset of World War II. There were several dramatic changes on Ball State's campus during World War II. In 1939 Ball State began its Civilian Pilot Training program which had popular enrollment. This program allowed students and local resident to learn to fly, instructed by the Muncie Aviation Company. By the Fall of 1941 Ball State reached its peak enrollment to this point of 1,588 students. When the United States entered the war, Ball State like many other college campuses, saw a decline in male enrollment. At this time Ball State partnered with the United States military and established two training programs on campus, the Army Specialized Training Program and Navy V-1 Program. Each of these programs encouraged male enrollment in the college that also trained them to go on as pilots in the military service.

Ball State students and staff also contributed to the war effort by supporting the troops abroad. Students and staff led by Sherly DeMotte, a member of the English faculty, wrote dozens of letters to Ball State students and staff serving overseas. By 1943 a dozen students from Ball State had become war casualties. To bring awareness to their service, in 1943 the War Morale Committee headed by Dr. LaFollette in collaboration with the class of 1943, dedicated the Roll of Honor in April. This memorial wall listed the names of all those who served during the war. By the War's end, forty-eight students had given their lives in the service and Ball State had trained more than 1,200 pilots in their training program. Those who paid the ultimate sacrifice were honored by Ball State in 1946 in their "Gold Star Memorial Service" in which surviving family members of those students were invited to the school and honored by students and staff.

Independent institution (1961-present) 

In 1961, Ball State became independent of The Indiana State University through the creation of the Ball State College Board of Trustees. The official name of the school was also changed to Ball State College. The Indiana General Assembly approved the development of a state-assisted architecture program, establishing the College of Architecture and Planning, which opened on March 23, 1965. The Center for Radio and Television (now named the College of Communication, Information, and Media) opened the following year, in 1966.

Recognizing the college's expanding academic curriculum and growing enrollment (10,066 students), the General Assembly approved renaming the school to Ball State University in 1965. Most of the university's largest residence halls were completed during this period of high growth, including DeHority Complex (1960), Noyer Complex (1962), Studebaker Complex (1965), LaFollette Complex (1967), and Johnson Complex (1969). Academic and athletic buildings, including Irving Gymnasium (1962), Emens Auditorium (1964), Cooper Science Complex (1967), Scheumann Stadium (1967), Carmichael Hall (1969), Teachers College Building (1969), Pruis Hall (1972), and Bracken Library (1974), also expanded the university's capacity and educational opportunities.

The university experienced another building boom beginning in the 2000s, with the openings of the Art and Journalism Building (2001), Shafer Tower (2001), the Music Instruction Building (2004), the David Letterman Communication and Media Building (2007), Park Hall (2007), Kinghorn Hall (2010), Marilyn K. Glick Center for Glass (2010), and the Student Recreation and Wellness Center (2010).

Under the university's 14th president, Dr. Jo Ann Gora, over $520 million was committed to new construction and renovation projects throughout the Ball State campus. Within the last decade, Ball State University adopted Education Redefined as its motto, focusing on "immersive learning" with the goal of engaging students across all academic programs in real-world projects. To date, there have been over 1,250 immersive learning projects, impacting residents in all of Indiana's 92 counties under the mentoring of faculty from every academic department.

The university has also adopted environmental sustainability as a primary component to the university's strategic plan and vision. Starting in the mid-2000s, all building additions and renovations are designed to meet Leadership in Energy and Environmental Design (LEED) certification standards. Ball State announced in 2009 that it would begin construction on the largest geothermal energy conversion project in U.S. history.

The university was defendant in the U.S. Supreme Court case Vance v. Ball State University, which dealt with who can be regarded as a "supervisor" for the purposes of harassment lawsuits. The case was argued November 26, 2012. In a 5–4 decision, the court ruled in favor of Ball State on June 24, 2013.

Campus 
 
Ball State University's campus spans  and includes 109 buildings at  centered mostly on two main quadrangles. (The university also has just over 400 additional acres of research property.) The original quadrangle, "Old Quad," anchors the south end of campus and includes most of the university's earliest academic buildings, Christy Woods, and the Wheeler-Thanhauser Orchid Collection and Species Bank. The focal points of the Old Quad are Beneficence and the Fine Arts Building, home to the David Owsley Museum of Art since 1935. The museum contains some 11,000 works valued at more than $40 million. The Fine Arts Terrace, overlooking the Old Quad, hosts the annual spring commencement ceremonies. The newer quadrangle is located to the north and consists of a variety of modern buildings (1960–present), with such landmarks as Bracken Library, Emens Auditorium, and the Frog Baby Fountain, located on University Green. Shafer Tower is the focal point of the new quadrangle. Located in the median of McKinley Avenue, Shafer Tower is a  free-standing bell tower with a 48-bell carillon. McKinley Avenue, which runs north-south through campus, acts as a spine or axis of activity connecting the two main quadrangles. The Scramble Light at the intersection of Riverside and McKinley is a pedestrian scramble that halts vehicular traffic in 30-second sequences, allowing pedestrians to cross the intersection in every direction, including diagonally.
A campus master plan calls for the creation of an East Academic Quad, which will focus on the Health Professions Building, opened Fall 2019, and a Foundational Sciences Building, expected to open Summer 2021. The North Residence Hall and North Dining Hall both opened in fall 2020 as part of the master plans North Residential Neighborhood. Other details of the plan include developing a new east mall, activating University Green, preserving and enhancing the Old Quad, engaging the Village, consolidating recreation, and enhancing athletics.

Most of Ball State University's athletic facilities and intramural fields are located on the northernmost portion of campus near the intersection of McGalliard Road and Tillotson Avenue. These include First Merchants Ballpark Complex (Ball Diamond and Softball Field), Briner Sports Complex, Fisher Football Training Complex, and the 22,500-seat Scheumann Stadium, home to Ball State Cardinals football. The 11,500-seat John E. Worthen Arena anchors the central campus athletic facilities, including the Field Sports Building, the Health and Physical Activity Building, Lewellen Aquatic Center, and the Jo Ann Gora Student Recreation and Wellness Center. Other facilities include the Cardinal Creek Tennis Center and Lucina Tennis Courts. In January 2018, the Earl Yestingsmeier Golf Practice Facility opened after a year of construction. The 6400 square foot facility features a state of the art 20' x 20' digital simulator.

York Prairie Creek, also known as Cardinal Creek, begins at the pond outside Park Hall on campus, winding northwest connecting to the Duck Pond before heading west toward the White River. The university's campus includes nearly 8,000 trees of about 625 species.

The university provides free shuttle service each semester. Shuttles run on red, green, and blue loops every five to ten minutes, Monday through Thursday, from 7:15 am to 11:00 pm (7:15 am to 8:00 pm on Fridays), and every ten to 15 minutes on Sundays from 5:00 pm to 11:00 pm. Muncie Indiana Transit System (MITS) also provides free bus service to students on local routes, particularly on Routes 1, 2, 14, and 16 which run through campus.

Architecture

Most campus facilities feature red or brown brick façades with the exceptions of Elliott and Pruis Halls, each made of Indiana limestone. Completed in 1899 as the university's first building, the Frank A. Bracken Administration Building was built in Neoclassical style with a yellow brick façade. Most campus facilities built prior to 1960 feature Collegiate Gothic architecture, including Ball Gymnasium, Burris Laboratory School, Fine Arts Building, and L. A. Pittenger Student Center. Other examples include Burkhardt Building, North Quad Building, and Lucina Hall.

Several modern campus buildings (early-1960s to early-1980s) have been built in Brutalist architecture, embracing blank walls and exposed concrete. Examples of this style include the Architecture Building, Bracken Library, and Whitinger Business Building.

Recent building additions and expansions (early-1990s to present) have shied away from Brutalist designs, and instead, have been built to respect the scale and style of the university's older Collegiate Gothic buildings. While red and brown brick accented by limestone has remained the favored façade materials, large windows have become more commonplace in buildings constructed since the late-1990s to emphasize natural lighting. Examples of this architecture include the Alumni Center, Art and Journalism Building, Music Instruction Building, and the David Letterman Communication and Media Building.

Sustainability
Ball State has adopted environmental sustainability as a primary component to the university's strategic plan and vision. Starting in the mid-2000s, all building additions and renovations are designed to meet Leadership in Energy and Environmental Design (LEED) certification standards. Standards include environmentally-friendly site selection, energy and water efficiency, materials selection, and indoor environmental quality, among others. The university diverts 20 percent of its waste from landfills through recycling efforts and also invests in hybrid vehicles, hybrid-electric shuttle buses, and vehicles that use E85.

At Spring 2009 Commencement, then-president Jo Ann Gora announced Ball State's plan for the largest geothermal energy project of its kind in the United States. Ball State has committed to reducing greenhouse gas emissions by nearly 80,000 tons annually through the installation of a $65 million geothermal heating and cooling system and the closing of all four coal-fired boilers on campus. The move is expected to save the university $2 million in fuel costs annually. The geothermal system will consist of 4,000 boreholes and two energy stations on campus. The system will consist of two underground loops to circulate water for heating and cooling throughout campus.

Since 2007, 13 campus buildings have achieved Leadership in Energy and Environmental Design certification. The Marilyn K. Glick Center for Glass and Teachers College Building are considered LEED certified. The David Letterman Communication and Media Building, Park Hall, DeHority Hall, Kinghorn Hall, and the Jo Ann Gora Student Recreation and Wellness Center have earned LEED Silver certification. Studebaker East Residence Hall, District Energy Station North, Applied Technology Building, Botsford/Swinford Residence Hall, Schmidt/Wilson Residence Hall, and District Energy Station South have earned LEED Gold certification. The university's first green roof was installed on the North District Energy Station in 2011, while a second smaller green roof was installed on the second floor of the Architecture Building in 2013.

Former president Jo Ann Gora was a founding member of the American College and University Presidents Climate Commitment, an initiative taken by several institutions to address climate change and reduce greenhouse gas emissions on their campuses. In 2011, the Sustainable Endowments Institute gave the university a College Sustainability Report Card grade of "C+."

Satellite facilities
Ball State operates two satellite facilities in the state of Indiana: the Fishers Center for Academic and Economic Innovation and CAP: INDY. The location offers academic programs, community engagement, and professional development sessions to students, alumni, and organizations. During the spring semester, entrepreneurship student teams are paired with six Launch Fishers companies to develop growth strategies for each company.

Located in Downtown Indianapolis, CAP: INDY opened in August 2016 as an urban laboratory for the R. Wayne Estopinal College of Architecture and Planning. CAP:INDY offers space for interdisciplinary collaboration between graduate students in architecture, landscape architecture, urban planning, and historic preservation. The center moved in 2019 to North Pine Street after its previous home of Ball State's Indianapolis Center closed.

Academics

Student body

Ball State University enrolls approximately 21,500 students who come from throughout Indiana, the United States, and around the world. Out-of-state students make up about 25 percent of enrollment, and ethnic minorities comprise about 23 percent. The university enrolls more than 300 international students.

As of the 2020–2021 school year, Ball State University's student population primarily consisted of Indiana residents (74 percent) with 25 percent being nonresidents. Sixty-five percent of the student body is female. The university is selective, admitting 77 percent of applicants in 2019.

Tuition
For the 2021–2022 academic year, annual undergraduate tuition is $8,284 for in-state students taking 12 to 18 credits per semester and $25,518 for out-of-state students. Including technology, recreation, Health Center, and room and board fees, annual undergraduate expenses total about $21,086 for in-state students and $38,320 for out-of-state students. For the 2021–2022 academic year, annual graduate tuition is $7,748 for in-state students taking nine credits per semester, and $21,222 for out-of-state students. Including other fees, in-state graduate student expenses total $20,560 and $34,024 for out-of-state graduate students.

Colleges

Ball State University offers five associate degrees, 119 bachelor's, 78 master's,15 doctoral degrees, 60 post-baccalaureate certificates, and three post-master's certificates through seven academic colleges. In Fall 2020, the average campus class size was 21 students, with a student-to-teacher ratio of 16 to 1.

Ball State University has been accredited by The Higher Learning Commission continuously since 1925.

Library system
 
Bracken Library is the university's main library. Completed in 1975, Bracken houses five floors of classrooms, computer labs, private study suites, and video viewing suites. The library provides access to about 2.3 million books, periodicals, microforms, audiovisual materials, software, government publication maps, musical scores, archival records, and other information sources. Bracken Library hosts the Ball State University Digital Media Repository, an open-access resource containing over 130,000 digital objects in 64 collections, as well as the Center for Middletown Studies. System branches include the Architecture Library and the Science–Health Science Library. Over 1.1 million visits were made throughout the University Libraries system between 2011 and 2012.

Rankings

Ball State ranked 191st nationally on U.S. News & World Reports 2021 “Top Performers on Social Mobility” list. College Magazine ranked the university No. 6 in the country for “Top 10 Campuses for Students with Disabilities.” The Princeton Review also classifies Ball State as among its “Best Midwestern” universities and “Green Colleges.” Insight into Diversity has awarded a Higher Education Excellence in Diversity (HEED) award every year since 2016.

The entrepreneurial management program ranked among the top 50 in the U.S. in The Princeton Review 2020 rankings. U.S. News & World Report ranked Ball State 36th in 2021 for First-Year Experiences, 46th in the U.S. in audiology programs, 47th in rehabilitation counseling programs, 84th in “Best Education Schools,” 92nd in speech-language pathology programs, 166th in public affairs programs, and 202nd in psychology programs.

Several programs are nationally ranked in their respective categories in U.S. News & World Reports “Best Online Programs” list: the master’s in curriculum and educational technology 4th, master’s in nursing education 5th, master’s in educational administration and supervision 11th, master of business administration 15th, master’s in special education 16th, master’s in nursing 17th, and bachelor’s programs 29th.

Student life

Housing
 
Ball State University operates 14 residence halls for its students, with a 15th expected to open during the 2021-2022 school year. A 16th residence hall, Burkhardt/Jeep Hall in the Wagoner Complex, houses students of the Ball State-operated Indiana Academy.

Anthony and Scheidler Apartments on campus accommodate upper-level single students, students with families, and university faculty and staff. Prices vary for on-campus living with meal plan access to dining facilities. LaFollette Complex had previously contained about 1,900 students, the highest capacity residence hall complex on campus, but began undergoing demolition in 2017. As of 2020, Brayton/Clevenger residence hall was the only remaining hall in the complex.

The majority of residence halls are home to living-learning communities in which students enrolled in the same majors or similar majors are housed together and participate in special activities.

Student organizations and activities
 
More than 400 student organizations at Ball State include numerous student government, departmental and professional, special interest, and service groups, all sanctioned by the Office of Student Life in the L. A. Pittenger Student Center. Multicultural organizations include the Asian American Student Association, Black Student Association, Latinx Student Union, and Spectrum, for LGBTQ equity. Ball State is often credited as one of the first universities in the nation to begin a Safe Zone training program, which began in 1992, to educate the public and empower LGBTQ allies and advocates. Other notable groups include the Residence Hall Association, Student Government Association, and Student Voluntary Services.

During the 2020–21 academic year, Ball State University was home to 31 Greek letter organizations on campus.

Media
Eight student-run media organizations operate as part of Ball State's Unified Media Lab in its College of Communication, Information, and Media. The lab includes the Ball State Daily News, Ball Bearings magazine, Byte, Cardinal Metrics, Cardinal WX, Newslink Indiana, Ball State Sports Link, and WCRD radio station.

Ball State Daily News 
The Ball State Daily News is a student newspaper with articles published daily online and a weekly print circulation of 10,000 copies, published every Thursday during the academic year, excluding exams and vacation. Originally founded in 1922 as The Easterner, the newspaper was among the first student publications to be inducted into the Associated Collegiate Press’ Hall of Fame in 1988 and has won numerous national pacemaker awards.

Ball Bearings magazine 
Ball Bearings is an online and print student magazine that focuses on in-depth articles. The publication has won several national and statewide awards from the Society for Professional Journalists and Associated Collegiate Press.

Byte 
Byte is a multimedia student organization that produces news, features, reviews, graphics, podcasts, and videos focusing on entertainment, technology, and culture.

Cardinal Metrics 
Cardinal Metrics is an analytics agency in which students work with professional clients to provide analysis and consultation services.

Cardinal WX 
Cardinal WX, or "Waking up with Cardinal Weather," a morning mobile show that provides news, weather, and lifestyle trends. The show airs 8 a.m. (Eastern) Friday mornings.

NewsLink Indiana 
NewsLink Indiana is a three-times-weekly 30-minute broadcast. The show covers local news, national news, entertainment, weather, and sports. NewsLink has won numerous Lower Great Lakes Regional Emmy Awards.

Ball State Sports Link 
Ball State Sports Link started in 2009 as one of the university's immersive learning projects. Students cover athletics, including live remote productions, live-to-tape events, television programs, student-athlete features, Facebook live shows, and social media content. The programs also includes a digital radio broadcast, social media management and analytics, and podcasts.

WCRD 
WCRD is a non-commercial radio station operated full-time by Ball State students from studios in the David Letterman Communication and Media Building.

The McKinley Avenue Agency 
The Department of Journalism supports The McKinley Avenue Agency, a student-run public relations and advertising agency that works with other university offices and community businesses. Services include media sales, creative services, public relations and communications, and events and contests. The organization merged with the former Cardinal Communications, which focused on public relations services.

Ball State Public Media 
The university announced in October 2020 the formation of Ball State Public Media, a partnership between Ball State PBS (formerly WIPB) and Indiana Public Radio (WBST).

Athletics

Ball State competes in the NCAA Division I (FBS) and is part of the Mid-American Conference (MAC) in all sports except for men's volleyball, where it competes in the Midwestern Intercollegiate Volleyball Association (MIVA).

In 2018, Beth Goetz was named as the Director of Athletics, proceeding Mark Sandy. Goetz is Ball State's second female Director of Athletics in the history of the department.

Ball State Cardinals football was established in the 1924 season and has a 461-434-32 (.515) record as of January 2021. Ball State has won six conference championships in football, most recently in 2020, and has appeared in seven NCAA Division I postseason bowl games, most recently in 2020 defeating San Jose State, 34-13, in the Offerpad Arizona Bowl for the Cardinals’ first-ever bowl victory. Ball State has a 1-7-1 bowl game record. Ball State annually competes against conference rival Northern Illinois, playing for the Bronze Stalk Trophy; Ball State holds a 3–10 record in the contest. Mike Neu is the current head coach, a position he has held since 2016.

Ball State Cardinals men's basketball began in 1920. Although there was little success in the program from its start until the 1970s, the next two decades would be the highlight of the program's performance. Ball State became a powerhouse in the Mid-American Conference, winning a record seven MAC tournaments and with subsequent appearances in the NCAA Division I men's basketball tournament between 1981 and 2000. The Cardinals' most successful year was 1990 when the team reached the Sweet Sixteen but lost to eventual national champion UNLV, 69-67. Even though the Cardinals lost the game, BSU player Chandler Thompson recorded what is considered to be one of the most memorable put-back dunks in college basketball history. The team's last NCAA Division I men's basketball tournament appearance was in 2000. James Whitford became head coach in 2013.

Charlie Cardinal is Ball State's mascot, modeled after Indiana's state bird, the northern cardinal.

Traditions

Beneficence 
The statue Beneficence (aka "Benny") is a bronze statue dedicated in 1937 on Ball State's quad. The statue was sculpted by Daniel Chester French, creator of the Abraham Lincoln statue in the Lincoln Memorial. Beneficence was selected to recognize the generosity of the five Ball brothers, who founded the university and made many other contributions to Muncie, Indiana. The statue serves as a primary symbol for the university, including being the focus of Ball State's official logo.

Frog Baby
The Frog Baby statue has been the center of legend and tradition since it was presented by Frank Ball in 1937. While initially on display in the David Owsley Museum of Art, students began a tradition of rubbing the statue's nose for good luck before taking exams. Over the years, the nose was worn away, and in 1993, the statue was sent overseas for refurbishment. Today, Frog Baby is situated in a fountain on University Green. Since its move and restoration, students have started a new tradition of dressing the statue to reflect weather patterns (scarves and hats in the winter) or current university events (jerseys and helmets for upcoming football games). Despite 24/7 surveillance, the statue has been a repeated target of vandals.

Homecoming
Beginning in 1926, Homecoming has brought several traditions. Homecoming Parade was first held in 1939. The parade route begins at Muncie Central High School downtown, travels west down University Avenue through The Village, and ends at McKinley and Neely avenues on campus. The 75th anniversary of the parade in 2012 saw over 100 float entries. Since the inaugural event in 1980, the Homecoming Bed Race has been held the Friday before homecoming. The annual event consists of five person teams within seven divisions, racing beds down a 100-yard course on Riverside Avenue in zany costumes. Other Homecoming traditions include the Air Jam lip-sync competition and Talent Search scholarship talent show.

Other traditions
Starting in 2004, Ball State students adopted "Chirp! Chirp!" as a school chant to cheer on teams during sporting events. Traditionally, The Chirp chant begins on the opposing team's third down during Ball State Cardinals football games. Accompanying the chant, participants usually place their index finger and thumb together, extending the other three fingers straight up, and moving their arm in an up and down motion.

For at least a decade it had become tradition for students and visitors to stick pieces of chewed gum to a honey locust tree located between Emens Parking Garage and Pruis Hall. The trunk of the "Gum Tree," as it had been named, was covered in colorful wads of used gum. The tree was removed in 2017 by the university in preparation for construction of the East Mall.

Responding to a friend's bet, former student Aaron Scheibelhut began the tradition of "Happy Friday Guy" in 2004. Donning a superhero costume, Happy Friday Guy is an anonymous student who rides a scooter around campus shouting "Happy Friday!" among other positive reinforcements to passersby every Friday. Since the character's creation, three students have served as Happy Friday Guy.

Notable alumni
 

Ball State University has about 197,000 alumni worldwide. A few of Ball State's most notable graduates include:

 Kent C. "Oz" Nelson (BA 1959, LLD 1994), former president and CEO of UPS
 Jim Davis (BA 1967, LittD (h.c.) 1991), creator of the Garfield comic strip
 David Letterman (BA 1969), Emmy Award-winning former host of the Late Show
 Actress Joyce DeWitt (BA 1972)
 Architect Craig W. Hartman (BArch 1973, DA 2009)
 Angela Ahrendts (BA 1981, DHL 2010), former CEO of Burberry and former Apple Inc. executive
 Jeffrey D. Feltman (BS 1981, LLD 2013), United Nations Under-Secretary-General for Political Affairs, former U.S. Ambassador to Lebanon
 Brian Gallagher (BSW 1981), former president and CEO of United Way Worldwide
 Actor Doug Jones (BA 1982)
 John Schnatter (BA 1983, LLD 2015), founder and former chairman of Papa John's Pizza
 Angelin Chang, (BA and BM 1990) Grammy Award-winning classical pianist
 Jason Whitlock (BS 1990), sportswriter and host of Speak for Yourself
 Tiara Thomas (BA 2012), Grammy Award and Academy Award-winning singer-songwriter

See also
List of colleges and universities in Indiana
List of Ball State University Presidents

Notes

References

Further reading
Ball, Edmund F., From fruit jars to satellites: The story of Ball Brothers Company, Incorporated, Newcomen Society, 1960
Ball State University, The Elisabeth Ball Collection of paintings, drawings, and watercolors: Ball State University Art Gallery, January 15 – February 26, 1984, Indiana University Press, 1984, 
Birmingham, Frederic A., Ball Corporation, the first century, Curtis Publishing, 1980, 
 Bullock, Kurt E., Ball State University: A sense of place, Ball State University Alumni Association, 1993, 
 Edmonds, Anthony O., & Geelhoed, E. Bruce, Ball State University: An Interpretive History, Indiana University Press, 2001, 
 Hoover, Dwight W., Middletown revisited, Ball State University Press, 1990,

External links

Ball State Athletics website

 
Educational institutions established in 1918
Ball State
Buildings and structures in Muncie, Indiana
Education in Delaware County, Indiana
Midwestern Intercollegiate Volleyball Association
Tourist attractions in Muncie, Indiana
1918 establishments in Indiana
Universities and colleges accredited by the Higher Learning Commission